Ruun is the ninth full-length album by the Norwegian black metal band Enslaved. It was released on 2 May 2006. It was given Norway's 2006 Spellemann award for best achievement in the "metal" genre.

Track listing

Personnel
Grutle Kjellson - bass guitar, vocals
Ivar Bjørnson - guitar, effects
Arve Isdal - guitar
Herbrand Larsen - keyboards, vocals
Cato Bekkevold - drums, percussion

Production
Produced by Enslaved
Engineered and recorded by Johnny Skallberg
Vocals recorded by Herbrand Larsen
Additional keyboards and effects recorded by I. Peersen
Mixed by Mike Hartung
Mastered by Bjorn Engeman

References

Enslaved (band) albums
2006 albums